theLotter is a worldwide online lottery ticket purchasing service. TheLotter agents physically purchase official lottery tickets on their customers' behalf. The tickets are scanned and uploaded to customer's account before the draw. theLotter offer customers from all over the world an opportunity to play more than 50 of the most popular draws including the US Powerball, Mega Millions, EuroMillions, SuperEnalotto, EuroJackpot, the Australian Powerball and more.

History 
Founded in 2002, theLotter is a privately owned company that claims to be the first-of-its-kind lottery messenger service and to have paid out over $100 million in prizes to more than 7 million winners across the globe.

Winners 
In December 2015, the story of an Iraqi man who won $6.4 million in the Oregon Megabucks lottery after purchasing his tickets at theLotter was widely reported around the world. The win was controversial for a number of reasons. The Oregon Lottery launched an investigation into whether international lottery ticket sales were legal. Chuck Baumann, spokesman for the Oregon Lottery, said there were no restrictions on foreigners winning prizes in the lottery or buying tickets through an online agent. According to Jack Roberts, director of the Oregon Lottery, the winner had done nothing wrong and most importantly, had all six winning numbers on his ticket. The Oregon Lottery made an exception on the winner’s behalf in lieu of potential risks to his family in Iraq and allowed him to remain anonymous.

In July 2017, Aura D. from Panama won a $30 million Florida Lotto jackpot after purchasing her ticket at theLotter.

Licenses 
TheLotter currently has licenses from national supervisory bodies for lotteries in Malta, Sweden, Australia and Isle of Man. In addition, theLotter launched their services in the US, at Texas, Minnesota and Oregon.

Restricted countries 
There is a list of countries that won't be accepted by TheLotter because of the regulation:

Afghanistan, Bulgaria, Canada, Cuba, Czech Republic, France, Greece, Israel, Iran, Liechtenstein, Lithuania, Poland, Sudan, Sierra Leone, Somalia, Switzerland, Syria, Turkey, Venezuela, Yemen.

Company information 
theLotter is operated by Lotto Direct Limited, a company registered in Malta (registration number: C77583) having its registered office at Vision Exchange Building, Level 1, Triq it-Territorjals, Zone 1, Central Business District, CBD 1070, Birkirkara.

References

External links 
 Lotto Direct Limited

Online gambling companies of Malta